Out of the Ashes is the third album from the anarcho street punk band Defiance, and first release on the New York-based record label Punk Core Records.

Track listing 
Terrorist Attack - 3:26
Not For You - 2:50
Spoils Of The Last War - 2:35
Watch It All Fall Down - 3:17
Into The Dust - 3:32
Another Statistic - 2:43
I've Had Enough - 3:10
Missiles... - 2:39
Dead End Generation - 2:29
No Room for You! - 3:20 (Demob cover)
It's Too Late - 4:33

Defiance (punk band) albums
2002 albums
Punk Core Records albums